Your Son is a 2018 thriller drama film directed by Miguel Ángel Vivas and written by Vivas and Alberto Marini. It stars José Coronado, Ana Wagener, Asia Ortega, Pol Monen and Ester Expósito. The plot revolves around Jaime Jiménez (Coronado), a surgeon who starts to investigate the beating of his teenage son, Marcos (Monen), outside a nightclub.

Your Son was released in Spain on 9 November 2018 by eOne. It was released internationally on Netflix on 1 March 2019.

Cast

See also 
 List of Spanish films of 2018

References

External links
 
 
 

2018 films
2018 thriller drama films
Films set in Seville
French films about revenge
French thriller drama films
Spanish films about revenge
2010s Spanish-language films
Spanish thriller drama films
Apache Films films
La Claqueta PC films
Films directed by Miguel Ángel Vivas
2010s Spanish films
2010s French films